On Deadly Ground is a 1994 American environmental  action adventure film directed, co-produced by, and starring Steven Seagal, and co-starring  Michael Caine, Joan Chen, John C. McGinley and R. Lee Ermey. It is Seagal's only directorial effort and features a minor appearance by Billy Bob Thornton in one of his early roles. Seagal plays Forrest Taft, an expert firefighter who chooses to fight back against the environmental destruction caused by his ruthless former employer (Caine).

Plot
Aegis Oil owns various oil refineries and rigs in Alaska, where the company faces great opposition from the public due to the increasing environmental damage done by its operations. Aegis had purchased the oil production rights from the local Tribal Council 20 years prior; however, the rights will revert to the natives if Aegis 1, the company's newest oil platform and biggest refinery, is not online within a certain deadline. In order to make the deadline in the face of multiple delays, CEO Michael Jennings forces his workers to use substandard parts.

Foreman Hugh Palmer's rig suffers a blowout due to the faulty parts. Trained firefighter Forrest Taft extinguishes the blaze. However, they have become suspicious of their company’s consistently poor safety record. Taft manages to hack into the company’s computer files and learn about the faulty parts. After being informed of Palmer's efforts to alert the Environmental Protection Agency and of Taft's access to restricted files, Jennings arranges for both of them to be eliminated by his Chief Security Officer, MacGruder and his assistant Otto. The two ransack Palmer's cabin and brutally torture and murder him when he refuses to cooperate. Meanwhile, Taft is ordered by Jennings to head over to another accident site, but realizes too late that the damaged building has been rigged as a booby trap. Taft narrowly survives the ensuing explosion and is rescued by Masu, the daughter of Inuit tribe chief Silook.

At the behest of Silook, Taft undergoes a vision quest in which he sees the full truth and vows to make amends for his part in Aegis's crimes. Meanwhile, the Aegis security team tracks him to Silook's village and when the tribe refuses to cooperate with them, a confrontation ensues, ending with MacGruder fatally shooting Silook. Taft returns in time to have one last talk with Silook before he succumbs to his wounds, vowing to avenge him and bring down Aegis.

Taft and Masu make their way to Palmer's cabin. While gathering supplies, they find his incriminating disk containing proof of Aegis's crimes. Otto and two Aegis security guards track the pair back to the cabin. Taft ambushes the party, quickly killing all of them. Jennings then deploys a squad of mercenaries led by an older man code-named “Stone”, but Taft manages to evade the group by killing several of the members with booby traps and blowing up a shack which obliterates a helicopter, effectively ending their pursuit.

Taft and Masu collect weapons and explosives and proceed to sneak into the refinery complex. Taft sabotages Aegis 1 by killing the main power and forcing a reboot, then releasing hydrochloric acid gas inside the refinery. He then plants a series of C-4 explosive charges onto several oil tanks and in the control room and sets them to a timer. 

Jennings has already arrived at the refinery to check on it when he gets word of Taft’s infiltration and orders his henchmen to find and kill him. Taft fights and eventually eliminates every opposing mercenary (including MacGruder and Stone) using firearms, a steel pipe, and even burning gasoline. He then confronts Jennings, condemns him for his greed and corruption, lassos one of his legs with a cable, puts it on a hook and shoots the cable, sending Jennings to his death into a pool of oil sludge. He and Masu then escape the rig just as the hidden C-4 charges detonate, causing a chain of explosions that ravages the entire plant. They flee the exploding refinery in an Aegis truck, escaping as Aegis 1 is torn down by the fire.

Later, Taft, far from being arrested for industrial sabotage and multiple murders, delivers a speech at the Alaska State Capitol about the dangers of oil pollution and the companies that are endangering the ecosystem.

Cast

Reception

Critical response
The film received negative reviews and has an approval rating of 12% at rottentomatoes.com. On Metacritic, the film has a score of 33%, based on reviews from 18 critics, indicating "generally unfavorable reviews". Audiences polled by CinemaScore gave the film a grade of "B+" on an A+ to F scale.

At the time of its release, Gene Siskel included the film in his "Worst of" list for 1994, singling out the melancholy tone of the film and the quality of Seagal's dialogue. On their syndicated TV show Siskel & Ebert, Siskel called the film's pyrotechnics "low rent" and stated that he "didn't think the fight sequences were anything special." He noted that Seagal's speech at the end was "more interesting than the actual fighting." 

Roger Ebert, for his part, stated the movie was "limited to two basic qualities: it's violent and it's sanctimonious", and opined that while "it doesn't pay to devote close attention to the plot", "if you like to see lots of stuff blowed up real good, then this'll be a movie for you." His opinion on the ending speech was that it was "absurd", stating, "at the end after Seagal kills about 30 people and blowing up the largest oil refinery in the world, what happens? He's invited to the Alaska State Legislature to give a talk about ecology. I'm not sure, but blowing up oil refineries does not make you that popular in Alaska."

Variety film critic Leonard Klady referred to the film as "a vanity production parading as a social statement" and commented that the film seemingly borrowed heavily from the earlier film Billy Jack, but opined that Seagal lacked "acting technique and the ability behind the camera to keep the story simple and direct" that Billy Jack star Tom Laughlin exhibited. Like Siskel, Klady also singled out the speech by Seagal's character at the end of the film.

The 1996 movie guide "Seen That, Now What?", the film was given the rating of "C-", stating "This combination action/environmental rights movie is an interesting hybrid in concept, but a filmic mess in execution, including embarrassing Eskimo shaman scenes and well-meaning lecture-finale on endangered species."

Seagalogy author Vern considers On Deadly Ground to be one of Seagal's defining works, writing, "It's the corniest, most unintentionally hilarious movie of his career... But it's also Seagal's most sincere and his most ballsy," going on to claim, "You can't understand Seagal if you haven't seen On Deadly Ground." He points out that many of the most important themes and motifs that define Seagal's work are present in the film, and more overtly so than in any of his other films.

Box office
The film grossed $38.6 million in the United States and Canada and $78.1 million worldwide against its reported $50 million budget.

Accolades

The film received six Golden Raspberry Awards nominations and won in the Worst Director category. The film is listed in Golden Raspberry Award founder John Wilson's book The Official Razzie Movie Guide as one of The 100 Most Enjoyably Bad Movies Ever Made.

Year-end lists
1st worst – Sean P. Means, The Salt Lake Tribune
2nd worst – Bob Strauss, Los Angeles Daily News
7th worst – Dan Craft, The Pantagraph
9th worst – Peter Travers, Rolling Stone
Top 10 worst (listed alphabetically, not ranked) – Mike Mayo, The Roanoke Times
Top 10 worst (not ranked) – Betsy Pickle, Knoxville News-Sentinel
Top 10 worst (not ranked) – Dan Webster, The Spokesman-Review

References

External links

Audio of Seagal's closing environmental thoughts

1994 films
1990s action adventure films
American action adventure films
Inuktitut-language films
Environmental films
Films about firefighting
Films scored by Basil Poledouris
Films about Native Americans
Films directed by Steven Seagal
Films set in Alaska
Films shot in Alaska
Films shot in Wyoming
Northern (genre) films
Warner Bros. films
Eco-terrorism in fiction
Golden Raspberry Award winning films
Works about petroleum
1994 directorial debut films
1990s English-language films
1990s American films
Petroleum in Alaska